Calcutta Mail is a 2003 Indian action thriller film starring Anil Kapoor, Rani Mukerji and Manisha Koirala. It was directed by Sudhir Mishra. The film is a remake of the 1998 Telugu film Choodalani Vundi.

Plot 
Avinash (Anil Kapoor) comes to Calcutta to search for his only son Ishu and finds himself engulfed with too many people interested in him. His only lead is a telephone number given to him by a cop before coming to Calcutta.
As soon, as he lands in Calcutta, he needs a place to stay. Here, he meets Reema aka Bulbul (Rani Mukherjee), a bubbly novelist who is supposed to be doing research for her novel. The room that Avinash gets is occupied by Bulbul. She refuses to vacate, so Avinash stays there too (though he sleeps outside the room). Bulbul falls in love with Avinash and becomes the light in his dark life.

There are flashbacks throughout the movie. Sanjana (Manisha Koirala) and Avinash once lived in Calcutta with their only child, a son. One day, Avinash witnessed a crime being committed and came to the assistance of the victim, taking him to hospital. This did not augur well with his assailants, and they killed Sanjana and abducted their child. The police was involved but was unable to trace the child.

A heartbroken and desperate Avinash decides to take matters into his own hands and begins inquiring. His inquiries take him to Mumbai via the Calcutta Mail, and this is where he will find out whether his son is alive or not, or whether he himself has been lured into a deadly trap.

Cast 
Anil Kapoor ... Avinash
Rani Mukerji ... Bulbul / Reema (dual role)
Manisha Koirala ... Sanjana
Satish Kaushik ... Sujan Singh
Sayaji Shinde ... Lakhan Yadav
Saurabh Shukla ... Ghatak
Deven Verma ... Reema's grandpa
 Ganesh Yadav ... 
Shivaji Satam ... Rana Rastogi
 Tarun Shukla 
Tara Mehta

Music
Lyrics penned by Mehboob Alam Kotwal and Javed Akhtar, CDs and Cassettes are available on Zee Records.

Development 
This movie is based on the 1998 Telugu film, Choodalani Vundi.

References

External links
 

2003 films
2000s Hindi-language films
Films set in Kolkata
Hindi remakes of Telugu films
Geetha Arts films
Films scored by Viju Shah
Films scored by Anand Raj Anand
Films directed by Sudhir Mishra